Sha'ar Efraim (lit. Efraim Gate) is a moshav in central Israel. Located in the Sharon plain, it falls under the jurisdiction of Lev HaSharon Regional Council.

History
The village was founded in 1953, and derived its name from the fact that the area was the home of the Tribe of Ephraim.

References

Moshavim
Populated places established in 1953
Populated places in Central District (Israel)
1953 establishments in Israel